Alex Christian Benoit (born 16 February 1964) is a Mexican alpine skier. He competed in three events at the 1988 Winter Olympics.

References

1964 births
Living people
Mexican male alpine skiers
Olympic alpine skiers of Mexico
Alpine skiers at the 1988 Winter Olympics
Place of birth missing (living people)
20th-century Mexican people